The Touriñán Lighthouse is an active lighthouse located in Muxía, province of A Coruña, Galicia, Spain. The current lighthouse is the second to be constructed at Cabo Touriñán a rocky headland on the Costa da Morte. It is managed by the port authority of A Coruña.

History
The first lighthouse at Touriñán, was completed in 1898, and consists of a single storey keeper's house with the tower centrally located at the apex of the roof.

A new lighthouse, which was built adjacent to the original building first entered service in 1981. It consists of a 11m high cylinder-shaped tower, that supports twin galleries and a lantern with a grey cupola. With a focal height of 65m above sea level, the light can be seen for 24 nautical miles. Its light characteristic is made up of a pattern of three flashes of white light every fifteen seconds.

See also

 List of lighthouses in Spain

References

External links 

 Wikimedia Commons hosts a category about the Touriñán lighthouse.

Lighthouses in Galicia (Spain)
Buildings and structures in Galicia (Spain)